Randall Caudill is president and founder of Dunsford Hill Capital Partners, a San Francisco-based financial consulting firm serving early stage health care and technology companies. Caudill serves on VaxGen board's Audit Committee and Compensation Committee and the Genentech Contract Committee. From 1987 to 1997, Caudill was employed by Prudential Securities, where he established and headed the firm's San Francisco investment banking practice. He also served as head of Prudential's Mergers and Acquisitions Department and co-head of the investment bank.

A native of Harlan, Iowa, where his father was a well known and respected dentist, Randall received a Ph.D. from Oxford University, where he was a Rhodes Scholar, a master's degree in Public and Private Management from Yale University, and a bachelor of arts from the College of the Holy Cross.

In 2012 he was appointed Director of PLM International Inc, An equipment leasing company based in San Francisco.

References

Living people
Alumni of the University of Oxford
American businesspeople
Year of birth missing (living people)